NGL may refer to:

Types, techniques, technologies
Next-generation lithography
Neues Geistliches Lied, a German genre of new songs for use in churches

Objects and products
Natural gas liquids, hydrocarbons in natural gas processing
Next Generation Launcher, a rocket designed by Orbital ATK (renamed OmegA in 2018)

Companies and organizations
National Guardian Life, an American life insurance company
North German Lloyd, a German shipping company
No Greater Love, U.S. humanitarian non-profit organization
NGL Prime SpA, a European launcher development company
National Gridiron League (Australia), a proposed American football league in Australia that never played
National Gridiron League (United States), a proposed American football league in the United States that never played
Nordic Golf League, a professional golf tour

Other uses
Nordic green left (disambiguation)